The Occupational Safety and Health Act 1994 is a piece of Malaysian legislation which was gazetted on 24 February 1994 by the Malaysian Parliament.

The principle of the Act is "To make further provision for securing that safety, health and welfare of persons at work, for protecting others against risks to safety or health in connection with the activities of persons at work, to establish the National Council for Occupational Safety and Health and for matters connected therewith."

The Act applies throughout Malaysia to the industries specified in the First Schedule. Nothing in this act shall apply to work aboard ships governed by the Merchant Shipping Ordinance 1952 [Ord. No. 70 of 1952], the Merchant Shipping Ordinance 1960 of Sabah [Sabah Ord. No. 11 of 1960] or Sarawak [Sarawak Ord. No. 2 of 1960] or the armed forces.

Structure
The Occupational Safety and Health Act 1994, in its current form (1 January 2006), consists of 15 Parts containing 67 sections and 3 schedules (including no amendment).
 Part I: Preliminary
 Part II: Appointment of Officers
 Part III: National Council for Occupational Safety and Health
 Part IV: General Duties of Employers and Self-Employed Persons
 Part V: General Duties of Designers, Manufacturers and Suppliers
 Part VI: General Duties of Employees
 Part VII: Safety and Health Organizations
 Part VIII: Notification of Accidents, Dangerous Occurrence, Occupational Poisoning and Occupational Diseases, and Inquiry
 Part IX: Prohibition against Use of Plant or Substance
 Part X: Industry Codes of Practice
 Part XI: Enforcement and Investigation
 Part XII: Liability for Offences
 Part XIII: Appeals
 Part XIV: Regulations
 Part XV: Miscellaneous
 Schedules

List of regulations under this Act 
 Occupational Safety and Health (Employers' Safety and Health General Policy Statements) (Exception) Regulations 1995
 Occupational Safety and Health (Control of Industry Major Accident Hazards) Regulations 1996
 Occupational Safety and Health (Safety and Health Committee) Regulations 1996
 Occupational Safety and Health (Classification, Packaging and Labelling of Hazardous Chemicals) Regulations 1997  Repealed by the Occupational Safety and Health (Classification, Labelling and Safety Data Sheet of Hazardous Chemicals) Regulations 2013)
 Occupational Safety and Health (Safety and Health Officer) Regulations 1997
 Occupational Safety and Health (Safety and Health Officer) Order 1997
 Occupational Safety and Health (Prohibition of Use of Substance) Order 1999
 Occupational Safety and Health (Use and Standards of Exposure of Chemicals Hazardous to Health) Regulations 2000
 Occupational Safety and Health (Notification of Accident, Dangerous Occurrence, Occupational Poisoning and Occupational Disease) Regulation 2004dd
 Occupational Safety and Health (Noise Exposure) Regulations 2019

National Council for Occupational Safety and Health
The National Council for Occupational Safety and Health was established in 1995. Its main objective is "to ensure the safety, health and welfare of employees in the workplace is secure".

See also
 Occupational Safety and Health Act

References

External links
 Occupational Safety and Health Act 1994 
 NIOSH Malaysia Government own OSH services provider agency
 NIOSH Certification Sdn Bhd Malaysia OSH Certification Body

1994 in Malaysian law
Safety codes
Malaysian federal legislation
Occupational safety and health law